Hoplandria lateralis is a species of rove beetle in the family Staphylinidae. It is found in Central America, North America, and South America.

References

Further reading

External links

 

Aleocharinae
Beetles described in 1844